Nanjido (Nan(lily) Ji(mushroom) Do(island)) (Korean: 난지도 蘭芝島) was an island on a branch of the Han River of Seoul, Korea.

In the end of the 1970s, a dyke was constructed around the edge of Nanjido, and it became Seoul's official dump site. Between 1978 and 1993, Nanjido's accumulation of garbage grew quickly, increasing to 3,000 truck loads of waste per day and eventually creating a pyramid of refuse 98m high and occupying 2,715,900 square meters of land, thirty-four times larger than The Great Pyramid of Giza in Egypt. Currently, Korea has the biggest rate of per capita garbage production in the world (2.3 kg/person).

Nanjido stopped being a waste dumpsite in 1993 when city officials realized that with Seoul's expansion, the site could no longer be designated as marginal. By that time, Nanjido had accumulated 91,972,000 cubic meters of garbage—the equivalent of continuous dumping by 13,000,000 8.5-ton trucks for 15 years. Nanjido might be world's tallest waste dumpsite.

The garbage on Nanjido is no longer exposed. After closing it down, the city designated the site as an "ecology park" and began preparations to cover the mountain of garbage with trees. It is currently undergoing a land stabilization process that is expected to be completed by the year 2020. The walls were constructed deep into the ground to prevent the seepage of contaminated water into the Han River and streams. Methane and other gases were channeled into wells to provide heating to the World Cup Stadium and the surrounding residential district.

Now the whole area of 2.8 million square meters was transformed into five different theme parks, welcoming 9.8 million visitors every year. The five parks are equipped with conservation facilities for further revival of diversified ecological system.

References

External links
Seoul Worldcup Park
Seoul Metropolitan Government Hangang Project Headquarters

Environment of South Korea
Mapo District
Landfills
Former islands of South Korea
Islands of the Han River (Korea)
Islands of Seoul